The Newport station, also known as Missouri-Pacific Depot-Newport, is a historic railroad station at Walnut and Front Streets in Newport, Arkansas.  It is a long rectangular single-story brick and stucco topped by a hip roof, whose wide eaves are supported by large Italianate knee brackets.  Its roof, originally slate, is now shingled, detracting from its original Mediterranean styling.  A telegrapher's bay extends above the roof line on the track side of the building.  The building was built in 1904 by the Missouri-Pacific Railroad to handle passenger and freight traffic.

History

The Missouri-Pacific Railroad ended service on its crack Texas Eagle on April 30, 1971, one day before Amtrak took over passenger services. In March 1974, Amtrak's Inter-American was extended from Fort Worth to St. Louis, restoring passenger service to the Missouri-Pacific Railroad's main line. On September 15, 1974, stops were added at the former Missouri-Pacific stations in Walnut Ridge and Newport. The Inter-American was replaced by the Eagle in 1981, which in turn was renamed as the Texas Eagle in 1988.

The station was listed on the National Register of Historic Places in 1992. Service to Newport was ended on April 14, 1996, as part of a deal with the Union Pacific Railroad to add the stop at Mineola.

See also
List of Amtrak stations
National Register of Historic Places listings in Jackson County, Arkansas

References

External links

USA Rail Guide - Newport, Arkansas (NPT)

Railway stations on the National Register of Historic Places in Arkansas
Railway stations in the United States opened in 1904
Transportation in Jackson County, Arkansas
National Register of Historic Places in Jackson County, Arkansas
Railway stations closed in 1971
Railway stations in the United States opened in 1974
Railway stations closed in 1996
Former Amtrak stations in Arkansas
Former Missouri Pacific Railroad stations
Newport, Arkansas